In mathematics, a Busemann G-space is a type of metric space first described by Herbert Busemann in 1942.

If  is a metric space such that

  for every two distinct  there exists  such that  (Menger convexity)
 every -bounded set of infinite cardinality possesses accumulation points
 for every  there exists  such that for any distinct points  there exists  such that  (geodesics are locally extendable)

then X is said to be a Busemann G-space.  Every Busemann G-space is a homogenous space.

The Busemann conjecture states that every Busemann G-space is a topological manifold. It is a special case of the Bing–Borsuk conjecture. The Busemann conjecture is known to be true for dimensions 1 to 4.

References

Metric spaces
Topology
Manifolds